Julie Doiron (born June 28, 1972) is a Canadian singer-songwriter of Acadian heritage. She has been the bass guitarist and co-vocalist for the Canadian indie rock band Eric's Trip since its formation in 1990. She has released ten solo albums, beginning with 1996's Broken Girl, and is also the lead singer for the band Julie and the Wrong Guys.

Career
Doiron started playing guitar (later switching to bass) in Eric's Trip at the age of 18, having joined the band at the insistence of her then-boyfriend, Eric's Trip guitarist Rick White. Shortly before the band's break-up in 1996, she released a solo album under the name Broken Girl, which followed two previous 7-inch EPs ("Dog Love, Pt. 2" & "Nora") also released under that name. All of her subsequent material has been released under her own name. She started her own label, Sappy Records, to release several of her solo efforts. Although most of her solo material has been written and performed in English, she also released an album of French language material, Désormais, as well as several EPs of material sung in Spanish.

In 1999, Doiron performed at the 1999 Stardust Picnic festival at Historic Fort York, Toronto. That year she recorded an album with the Ottawa band Wooden Stars, which was the first time she had worked with a band since the end of Eric's Trip. Also in 1999, she was featured in a film, entitled Salt, which was filmed that fall. The film was created by the Naitonal Film Board of Canada, and released in 2000.She shared a Juno Award for Julie Doiron and the Wooden Stars in March 2000.

Eric's Trip reunited in 2001, and have played shows periodically ever since. She has also appeared as a guest musician on albums by The Tragically Hip (2000s Music at Work), Gordon Downie (2001's Coke Machine Glow, 2003's Battle of the Nudes and 2010's The Grand Bounce), and Herman Düne. In 2006 she helped launch SappyFest with Paul Henderson and Jon Claytor as an extension of the reinstated Sappy Records. She has also released a split record co-credited to the alternative country band Okkervil River, and collaborated with Frederick Squire and American musician Phil Elverum on the 2008 Mount Eerie album Lost Wisdom. She played with indie rock band Shotgun & Jaybird until their demise in 2007. She also played drums as part of a short-lived duo with Fred Squire.  Initially called "Blue Heeler", they changed their name to "Calm Down Its Monday", and released a split 7-inch EP on K Records, with two solo Doiron songs on the flip side.

Apart from her musical career, Doiron is an avid photographer, having published a book of her photographs entitled The Longest Winter with words by Ottawa writer Ian Roy. She often does her own promotional photos and cover artwork along with her ex-husband, painter Jon Claytor.

Her album Woke Myself Up was shortlisted for the 2007 Polaris Music Prize.

In 2009, Doiron told a reporter from The Strand, a college newspaper at the University of Toronto, that she and Chad VanGaalen were exploring the possibility of collaborating on an album. She appeared on a track from VanGaalen's EP of Soft Airplane B-sides that year, but no further news pertaining to a potential album collaboration has been released.

During the tour to support the 2009 album I Can Wonder What You Did with Your Day, the mayor of Bruno, Saskatchewan proclaimed June 7, 2009, as "Julie Doiron Day". Doiron performed at the local All Citizens arts centre on that day.

Over the three-year period between I Can Wonder and her 2012 album So Many Days, Doiron moved several times, residing at different times in Montreal, Toronto and Sackville. While living in Toronto, she had difficulty making ends meet due to the city's high cost of living, and began teaching yoga classes, and performing a weekly residency at the Saving Gigi club, to help pay the bills. By the time So Many Days was released in the fall of 2012, she had moved back to Sackville.

In July 2014, Doiron's song "The Life of Dreams", from I Can Wonder What You Did with Your Day, appeared in an iPhone commercial.

In 2016, Doiron collaborated with musicians Jon McKiel, C.L. McLaughlin, Michael C. Duguay, James Anderson and Chris Meaney on the project Weird Lines, whose self-titled album was released on Sappy Futures in July. She then collaborated with Eamon McGrath, Mike Peters and Jaye Schwarzer on the project Julie and the Wrong Guys, which released a self-titled album in 2017 on Dine Alone Records. In 2017 and 2018, Doiron has also released several EPs of Spanish language renditions of her own previously recorded songs.

In 2021 Doiron released the album I Thought of You. Her first full-length solo recording in nine years, it includes musical contributions from Daniel Romano and Dany Placard.

Collaborations 
Appeared on the 2005 Herman Dune album Not On Top, playing bass and providing vocals
Provided vocals for several tracks on the 1999 album The Moon by The Wooden Stars
Provided vocals on Snailhouse's 2001 album The Opposite Is Also True
Contributed vocals on Baby Eagle's 2007 No Blues
Contributed vocals on Mount Eerie's 2008 Lost Wisdom
Contributed vocals to Attack in Black's song "I'm A Rock" on the Autumnal Tour 2008 7-inch
Contributed vocals on Daniel Romano's 2013 album Come Cry With Me
Contributed vocals on Mount Eerie's 2019 album Lost Wisdom, pt. 2, a continuation of their prior collaboration in 2008.
Contributed vocals on Dany Placard's 2020 album J'connais rien à l'astronomie

Discography

Solo albums
Broken Girl * (Sub Pop, Sappy) – 1996 (Reissued by Jagjaguwar with the "Dog Love, Pt. 2" & "Nora" EP's as bonus tracks) - 2003
Loneliest in the Morning (Sub Pop, Jagjaguwar (reissue with bonus tracks)) – 1997
Will You Still Love Me? * (Tree Records, Sappy) – 1999
Julie Doiron and the Wooden Stars (Tree, Sappy) – 1999, Jagjaguwar (CD reissue in 2002, vinyl only re-issue in 2013)
Désormais * (Jagjaguwar, Endearing Records) – 2001
Heart and Crime (Jagjaguwar, Endearing) – 2002
Goodnight Nobody (Jagjaguwar, Endearing) – 2004
Woke Myself Up (Jagjaguwar, Endearing) – 2007
I Can Wonder What You Did with Your Day (Jagjaguwar, Endearing) – 2009
So Many Days (Aporia Records) – 2012
Julie Doiron Canta en Español Vol. II (Acuarela) - 2017
Julie Doiron Canta en Español Vol. III (Acuarela) - 2018
I Thought of You (You've Changed) - 2021
Albums marked with * have not been issued on vinyl LP

with Eric's Trip

with Julie and the Wrong Guys
 Heartbeats 7” (We Are Busy Bodies) - 2012
 Homeless 7-inch (Dine Alone) - 2016
 Julie & The Wrong Guys (Dine Alone) - 2017

Other
Dog Love Part 1 cassette (as Broken Girl) (no label) – 1991
Dog Love Part 2 7-inch (as Broken Girl) (Sappy Records) – 1993
Nora 7-inch (as Broken Girl) (Sappy) – 1995
"More of Our Stupid Noise (So Fast) - 1996 Squirtgun Records
Julie Doiron and the Wooden Stars - Who will be the one 7-inch (plumline) – 1999?
Julie Doiron / Okkervil River (CD Split with Okkervil River) (Acuarela) – 2003
Will You Still Love Me? + Julie Doiron and the Wooden Stars (Japan Edition 2 disc with original booklet)(P-VINE Record, Japan) – 2003
Heart and Crime + Désormais (Japan Edition 2 disc with original booklet)(P-VINE Record, Japan) – 2003
Lost Wisdom (Mount Eerie with Julie Doiron and Frederick Squire) – 2008
Daniel, Fred & Julie (with Daniel Romano and Frederick Squire) (You've Changed Records) – 2009
Julie Doiron Canta en Español ("La Alberca de Swan"/"Tus Niños") - 2015Weird Lines - 2016Lost Wisdom pt. 2 (Mount Eerie with Julie Doiron) – 2019Julie & Dany'' (with Dany Placard) - 2022

Notes and references

External links
 
 Eric's Trip Live Archive – Guide to Eric's Trip's studio sessions and live concerts, including side-projects.

1972 births
Living people
Canadian singer-songwriters
Canadian women rock singers
Canadian women guitarists
Canadian photographers
Acadian people
Sub Pop artists
Canadian indie rock musicians
Musicians from Moncton
Canadian indie pop musicians
Canadian folk rock musicians
Canadian rock bass guitarists
Women bass guitarists
French-language singers of Canada
Canadian women pop singers
Jagjaguwar artists
Juno Award for Alternative Album of the Year winners
Spanish-language singers of Canada
20th-century Canadian women singers
21st-century Canadian women singers
21st-century Canadian bass guitarists